Anthenea is a genus of sea stars in the family Oreasteridae.

Selected species

 Anthenea acanthodes H.L.Clark, 1938
 Anthenea aspera Döderlein, 1915
 Anthenea australiae Döderlein, 1915
 Anthenea conjugens Döderlein, 1935
 Anthenea crassa H.L.Clark, 1938
 Anthenea crudelis Döderlein, 1915
 Anthenea diazi Domantay, 1969
 Anthenea edmondi A.M.Clark, 1970
 Anthenea elegans H.L.Clark, 1938
 Anthenea flavescens (J.E.Gray, 1840)
 Anthenea godeffroyi Döderlein, 1915
 Anthenea grayi Perrier, 1875
 Anthenea mertoni Koehler, 1910
 Anthenea mexicana A.H.Clark, 1916
 Anthenea obesa H.L.Clark, 1938
 Anthenea pentagonula (Lamarck, 1816)
 Anthenea polygnatha H.L.Clark, 1938
 Anthenea regalis Koehler, 1910
 Anthenea rudis Koehler, 1910
 Anthenea sibogae Döderlein, 1915
 Anthenea tuberculosa J.E.Gray, 1847
 Anthenea viguieri Döderlein, 1915

 List source :

References

Oreasteridae
Taxa named by John Edward Gray